Gersbach may refer to:

Gersbach (Schopfheim), a nationally recognized resort and district of Schopfheim

People with the surname
Carl Gersbach
Melody Gersbach (1985–2010)
Alex Gersbach (Australian footballer)